Chuniella is a genus of nemerteans belonging to the family Chuniellidae.

The species of this genus are found in America.

Species:

Chuniella agassizii 
Chuniella compacta 
Chuniella elongata 
Chuniella lanceolata 
Chuniella pelagica 
Chuniella tenella

References

Polystilifera
Nemertea genera